Richard Connell (1893–1949) was an American writer.

Richard Connell may also refer to:

Richard E. Connell (1857–1912), American politician
Richard Connell (Irish politician) (1650–1714)
Mrs Richard Connell, sponsor of USS LST-888

See also
Richard O'Connell (disambiguation)